Strossen is a surname. Notable people with the surname include: 

Nadine Strossen (born 1950), American civil liberties activist 
Randall J. Strossen, American author